Sychesia subtilis is a moth in the family Erebidae. It was described by Arthur Gardiner Butler in 1878. It is found in Brazil and Suriname.

Subspecies
Sychesia subtilis subtilis (Brazil: Amazons)
Sychesia subtilis megalobus Jordan, 1916 (Suriname)

References

Arctiidae genus list at Butterflies and Moths of the World of the Natural History Museum

Moths described in 1878
Phaegopterina